Goasafat (also referred as Garsafat) is a census town in Moyna CD Block in Purba Medinipur district in the Indian state of West Bengal.

Geography

Location

Urbanisation
94.08% of the population of Tamluk subdivision live in the rural areas. Only 5.92% of the population live in the urban areas, and that is the second lowest proportion of urban population amongst the four subdivisions in Purba Medinipur district, just above Egra subdivision.

Note: The map alongside presents some of the notable locations in the subdivision. All places marked in the map are linked in the larger full screen map.

Demographics
As per 2011 Census of India Goasafat had a total population of 6,597 of which 3,438 (52%) were males and 3,159 (48%) were females. Population below 6 years was 821. The total number of literates in Goasafat was 4,819 (83.43% of the population over 6 years).

 India census, Goasafat had a population of 5,406. Males constitute 52% of the population and females 48%. Goasafat has an average literacy rate of 65%, higher than the national average of 59.5%: male literacy is 70%, and female literacy is 59%. In Goasafat, 17% of the population is under 6 years of age.

Infrastructure
As per the District Census Handbook 2011, Goasafat covered an area of 1.12 km2. It had the facility of a railway station at Tamluk 20 km away and bus routes in the town. Amongst the civic amenities it had 300 domestic electric connections. Amongst the medical facilities it had a hospital 7 km away. Amongst the educational facilities it had were 4 primary schools. The nearest  middle school, secondary school and senior secondary school were at Anandapur closeby. Amongst the recreational and cultural facilities 2 cinema theatres, a public library and a reading room were there in the town.

Transport
Goasafat is on Tangrakhali Road.

References

Cities and towns in Purba Medinipur district